Dubi may refer to:

People
 Dubi Tešević (born 1981), Bosnian football player
 Gérard Dubi (born 1943), Swiss ice hockey player
 Xue Dubi (1892–1973), Chinese politician

Places
 Dubi, Pathsala, India
 Dubí, Czech Republic

Other
 Dubi copperplate inscription